Dolycoris baccarum, the sloe bug or hairy shieldbug, is a species of shield bug in the family Pentatomidae.

Distribution and habitat
This species is widespread in most of Europe and Central Asia. These shield bugs mainly inhabit hedgerows and woodland edges, fields, forests, parks and gardens.

Description
The basic color of pronotum and elytra is quite variable, but usually it is reddish purple, while scutellum is ocher. During the winter the basic color is dull brown. The whole body is quite hairy. The antennae are made by 4-5 black and white sections and the margins of the abdomen (connexivum) are alternately mottled with whitish and black. The male and female are very similar. A related species encountered in Europe is Dolycoris numidicus.

Biology
It is univoltine in the northern part of the range and bivoltine in the warmer southern areas. Adults of these shield bugs can be found all year around, as they overwinter. They emerge in the following spring, when they mate and females lay eggs. By the end of summer the new generation of adults appear. Nymphs feed on many plants, especially Rosaceae and Asteraceae species, Linaria vulgaris and Lamium album.  Adults can be found frequently on shrubs feeding on berries, especially Honeysuckle and Raspberries. Despite the common name sloe bug, neither the larvae nor the adults feed on Sloe (Prunus spinosa).

Gallery

References

External links
 Nature Spot
 Insekten Box 

Pentatomidae
Bugs described in 1758
Articles containing video clips
Hemiptera of Europe
Taxa named by Carl Linnaeus

sv:Bärfis